Sonino may refer to:
Sonino, Tula Oblast, a village in Tula Oblast, Russia
Sonino, Yaroslavl Oblast, a village in Yaroslavl Oblast, Russia
Sonino, name of several other rural localities in Russia